New South Wales Patriots compete in the Claxton Shield baseball championship in Australia.

The Patriots were one of the founding teams of the Claxton Shield in 1934 and competed as New South Wales until 1988 when the Claxtion Shield was awarded to the winner of the Australian Baseball League. In 1999 they were invited to join the International Baseball League of Australia which they competed in for 2 seasons (1999-00 and 2002). After this point the Claxton Shield reverted to a competition similar to 1988.

History

Notable alumni
Gavin Fingleson, Olympic baseball silver medal winner

2010 Claxton Shield squad

New South Wales Patriot's roster for the 2010 Claxton Shield, announced by Baseball NSW.

See also

References

External links
Baseball NSW

1934 establishments in Australia
Baseball teams in Australia
Pat
Patriots
Sports teams in Sydney
Baseball teams established in 1934